Sotkamo is a municipality of Finland, located in the Kainuu region about  east of Kajaani, the capital of Kainuu. Vuokatti, in west of Sotkamo, is the most populous village in the municipality and also a popular skiing resort. Both Hiidenportti National Park and Tiilikkajärvi National Park are located in the municipality.

In sports, Sotkamo is known for its pesäpallo team, Sotkamon Jymy. The Hiukka Stadium is the home field of Sotkamon Jymy, and its well-known competitor is Vimpelin Veto from Vimpeli, known as long-time arch-enemy of Sotkamon Jymy.

One of the major landmarks of Sotkamo is the sandy beach of Hiukka, which locates by the lake Iso Sapsojärvi, just beside the Sotkamo center. In Vuokatti ski center you can find the lake Nuasjärvi and the Vuokatti Hill.

History
Sotkamo has grown beside a water route formed by a continuous band of lakes and rivers. The waters of the Sotkamo route run through Kajaaninjoki into Oulujärvi and finally to the Baltic Sea, but in the past the waterways also created an important commercial route to White Sea in the east. The same water route has been used by soldiers of Russia, Sweden and Denmark to rob and ravage this remote countryside for centuries. The name Sotkamo comes either from the Finnish word "sotku" which means a mess and refers to the obscure water route, or from the word "sotka" which was a general name for water birds in ancient Finnish and now designates the common goldeneye.

During the 19th century Sotkamo was visited by notable Finnish artists such as Akseli Gallen-Kallela and Hugo Simberg.

On November 17, 2007 first pictures of the Kern arc were made in the town of Sotkamo by Marko Mikkilä.

Villages

 Alasotkamo
 Heinämäki
 Halmetvaara
 Jormaskylä
 Juholankylä
 Korholanmäki
 Kontinjoki
 Laakajärvi
 Losovaara
 Naapurinvaara
 Nuasjärvi
 Ontojoki
 Paakinmäki
 Pohjavaara
 Riekinranta
 Sipinen
 Sipola
 Soidinvaara
 Sumsa
 Suovaara
 Tipasoja
 Torinkylä
 Tuhkakylä
 Vuokatti
 Ylisotkamo
 Ärväänkylä
 Maanselkä

Economy
Beside tourism, mining is important for the economy of Sotkamo. One of the largest nickel deposits in Europe is located in Talvivaara where the Talvivaara Mining Company started its operation in late 2008. Also Mondo Minerals mines talc in Lahnaslampi.

Notable people

 Anders Chydenius (1729–1803), Lutheran priest and a member of the Swedish Riksdag
 Kalle Arantola (1913–1940), skier
 Veikko Huovinen (1927–2009), author and forester
 Pirjo Häggman (born 1951), sprinter

See also
 Kuhmo

References

External links

Municipality of Sotkamo – Official website

 
Municipalities of Kainuu
Mining towns in Finland
Populated lakeshore places in Finland